Penta Career Center is a Public Vocational High School (grades 10-12) and Adult Education center located in Perrysburg Township, Wood County, Ohio, that opened operation in 1965.  It serves 16 school districts from the five counties of Fulton, Lucas, Ottawa, Sandusky, and Wood, hence the name "Penta."

School districts served

Anthony Wayne Local School District 
Benton-Carroll-Salem Local School District 
Bowling Green City School District 
Eastwood Local School District
Elmwood Local School District 
Genoa Area Local School District 
Lake Local School District 
Maumee City School District 
North Baltimore Local School District 
Northwood Local School District 
Otsego Local School District
Perrysburg Exempted Village School District 
Rossford Exempted Village School District 
Springfield Local School District 
Swanton Local School District
Woodmore Local School District

Programs offered

High school

Agricultural  Environmental Systems
Floral Design/Greenhouse Production
Gas & Diesel Engine Systems
Landscape & Turfgrass Management
Small Animal Care

Arts & Communication
Digital Video Production
Digital Arts and Design

Business & Administrative Services
Medical & Legal Office Management

Construction Technologies
Construction Carpentry
 Construction Electricity
 Construction Masonry
 Construction Remodeling
Heating & Air Conditioning Technology

Education & Training
Early Childhood Education
Teaching Professions

Engineering & Science Technologies
Alternative Energy Technology

Health Science
Dental Assistant
Exercise Science/Sports Health Care
Medical Technologies

Hospitality & Tourism
Culinary Arts

Human Services
Cosmetology
Hair Design

Information Technology
Computer Hardware/Networking
Geographic Information Systems (GIS)

Law & Public Safety
Public Safety/Criminal Justice
Public Safety/EMT-Fire Science

Manufacturing Technologies
Advanced Manufacturing Technologies
Computer-Aided Design (CAD)
Welding

Marketing
Marketing Education

Transportation Systems
Automotive Collision Repair
Automotive Technology
Special Education
Job Training
TIES. Program

Adult education

Full Time
Auto Body Collision
Automotive Technologies
Builder, Contractor, & Remodeler
General Office & Clerical Services
Heating, Ventilation, Air Conditioning/Refrigeration
Machine Trades
Welding & Fabrication

Part Time
Building & Maintenance
CNC Programmer Training
Computer Technology
Customized/Industry Training
Forklift Training
HVAC EPA Test
Lathe & Vertical Mill Operation
Low Pressure Boiler Systems
Marine Skills Mechanic
OHSA 10-hour
Plumbing Licensure
Welding
Transportation

Medical
CPR
Dietary Management Training (DMT)
Pharmacy Technician
Servsafe Certification
State Certified Nurse's Aide (STNA)
EKG Technician
Phlebotomy Technician (partnered with Herzig University)

Online
ed2go
Electronic Health Records Specialist (partnered with Boston Reed)
Medical Billing & Coding Specialist (partnered with Boston Reed)

References

External links
 Penta Career Center

Vocational schools in Ohio
Vocational education in the United States
Public high schools in Ohio